The University of Naples Federico II is a public university in Naples, Italy. Established in 1224, it is the oldest public non-sectarian university in the world, and is now organized into 26 departments. Noted for being the oldest state-funded university, it is believed to be the oldest secular state university in the world.

It was Europe's first university dedicated to training secular administrative staff, and is one of the oldest academic institutions in continuous operation. Federico II is the third University in Italy by number of students enrolled, but despite its size it is still one of the best universities in Italy and the world, in southern Italy it leads 1st Ranking since it started, being particularly notable for research; in 2015 it was ranked among the top 100 universities in the world by citations per paper. According to the CWUR ranking (Center for World University Rankings), in 2022-2023 it is confirmed as the sixth Italian university in the world ranking.

The university is named after its founder Frederick II.
In October 2016 the university hosted the first ever Apple IOS Developer Academy and in 2018 the Cisco Digital Transformation Lab.

History
The university of Naples Federico II was founded by emperor of the Holy Roman Empire Frederick II on 5 June 1224. It is the world's oldest state-supported institution of higher education and research. One of the most famous students was Roman Catholic theologian and philosopher Thomas Aquinas.

Political project of Frederick II
Frederick II had specific objectives when he founded the university in Naples: first, to train administrative and skilled bureaucratic professionals for the curia regis (the kingdom's ministries and governing apparatus), as well as preparing lawyers and judges who would help the sovereign to draft laws and administer justice.  Second, he wanted to facilitate the cultural development of promising young students and scholars, avoiding any unnecessary and expensive trips abroad: by creating a State University, Emperor Frederick avoided having young students during his reign complete their training at the University of Bologna, which was in a city that was hostile to the imperial power.

The University of Naples was arguably the first to be formed from scratch by a higher authority, not based upon an already-existing private school. Although its claim to be the first state-sponsored university can be challenged by Palencia (which was founded by the Castilian monarch c.1212), Naples certainly was the first chartered one.

The artificiality of its creation posed great difficulties in attracting students; Thomas Aquinas was one of the few who came in these early years. Those years were further complicated by the long existence, in nearby Salerno, of Europe's most prestigious medical faculty, the Schola Medica Salernitana. The fledgling faculty of medicine at Naples had little hope of competing with it, and in 1231 the right of examination was surrendered to Salerno. The establishment of new faculties of theology and law under papal sponsorship in Rome in 1245 further drained Naples of students, as Rome was a more attractive location.  In an effort to revitalize the dwindling university, in 1253, all the remaining schools of the university of Naples moved to Salerno, in the hope of creating a single viable university for the south. But that experiment failed and the university (minus medicine) moved back to Naples in 1258 (in some readings, Naples was "refounded" in 1258 by Manfred Hohenstaufen, as by this time there were hardly any students left). The Angevin reforms after 1266 and the subsequent decline of Salerno gave the University of Naples a new lease on life and put it on a stable, sustainable track.

From the 13th to the 16th century 
Initially the studies were directed towards law (fundamental for the formation of jurists), the liberal arts, medicine and theology: the latter, compared to other subjects, was taught in religious institutions, in particular in the convent of San Domenico Maggiore, where Thomas Aquinas taught from 1271 to 1274.

During the Angevin period (1265-1443) the structure and organization of the University remained substantially unchanged.

20th and 21st centuries 
At the turn of the 19th and 20th centuries, the prestige of the University of Naples increased, particularly in the scientific field: in the field of genetics it was a pioneer, with the establishment of the first chair in Italy. New building and organizational difficulties afflicted the university both during the Fascist period and during the World War II: the headquarters was set on fire by the Germans on 12 September 1943; laboratories and science labs were requisitioned by the allies.

After the war, following the modern evolution of the university model in general, the University of Naples became the second most important university in Italy in terms of number of students, second only to the Sapienza University of Rome.

On 7 September 1987, it assumed its current name as University of Naples Federico II in anticipation of the establishment, in 1991, through its spin-off, of the Università degli Studi della Campania Luigi Vanvitelli.

Campus 
The University of Naples Federico II possesses a vast architectural heritage, the result of acquisitions made over the centuries. Where not specified, the municipality to which it belongs is that of Naples.

 Central Headquarters (Palace of the University of Naples Federico II):
The headquarters of the University of Naples Federico II is located along Corso Umberto I, at the corner with Via Mezzocannone, at number 40. The building is in neo-baroque style and was erected during the Risanamento, between 1897 and 1908, based on a project by the architects Pierpaolo Quaglia and Guglielmo Melisurgo. The headquarters, as it is commonly and widely known in the university environment, stands close to the original university complex (which since 1777 had found its place in the Casa del Salvatore, no longer owned by the Jesuits). However, the new building was not isolated from the complex behind it as the architects took care to connect it with the pre-existing offices behind it through the so-called Scalone della Minerva, which originates in the courtyard of the University building and ends in the Jesuit courtyard, overcoming a height difference of more than 7 m. The site houses the offices of the central management of the university (Rectorate, Academic Senate, Treasury, etc.) and the Department of Law. It is also the secondary seat of the Department of Humanities.
 Policlinico – Cappella Cangiani Complex (Federico II University Hospital):  The Cangiani Chapel Complex, so called because it is located in the Cangiani district in Rione Alto (5th Municipality), covers an area of 441,000 m² on which 21 buildings stand for a covered area of 57,086 m² (and a total floor area of 257,118 m²). The main entrance to the university hospital complex is located in via Pansini; three other secondary entrances can be used on certain days and times. Mobility within the vast complex is ensured by a free mini-bus service which connects the main entrance with the various pavilions. The Department of Clinical Medicine and Surgery, the Department of Pharmacy, the Department of Molecular Medicine and Medical Biotechnology, the Department of Neurosciences and Reproductive and Odontostomatological Sciences, the Department of Public Health, the Department of Advanced Biomedical Sciences and the Department of Translational Medical Sciences.
 "Porta di Massa" Complex (Complex of San Pietro Martire): The Porta di Massa office is so called as it is located in Via Porta di Massa, 1. The Department of Humanities is located here, which includes the degree courses in Modern Literature, Languages, Cultures and Literature and Philosophy.
 Monte Sant'Angelo complex: seat of the scientific and economic area departments, it is located in Via Cupa Nuova Cintia, 21.

Organisation and governance

Faculties 
The university has 13 faculties:

 Agriculture
 Architecture
 Biotechnology
 Economics
 Engineering
 Law
 Letters and philosophy
 Mathematical, physical and natural sciences
 Medicine and surgery
 Pharmacy
 Political sciences
 Sociology
 Veterinary medicine

Ranking

Notable people

Alumni
Among those who have attended the University of Naples Federico II are Italian presidents Enrico De Nicola, Giovanni Leone and Giorgio Napolitano; mayors of Naples Luigi de Magistris and Gaetano Manfredi; CEO Fabrizio Freda; and philosophers Benedetto Croce and Nicola Abbagnano.

Samantha Cristoforetti, astronaut and commandor of the International Space Station
Saint Thomas Aquinas, philosopher and theologian
Leonardo Bianchi, physician and politician
Amadeo Bordiga, politician and political theorist
Giordano Bruno, philosopher, Dominican friar, mathematician and astronomer
Renato Caccioppoli, mathematician
Antonio Cardarelli, physician and politician
Ernesto De Martino, historian of religion and folklore scholar
Francesco De Martino, eminent jurist, intellectual and politician
Fabrizio de Miranda, structural engineer
Gaetano Filangieri, jurist and philosopher
Marta Filizola, computational biophysicist
Nicola Fusco, mathematician
Pietro Giannone, historian, philosopher and jurist
Nunziante Ippolito, physician and anatomist
Antonio Labriola, philosopher
Saint Alphonsus Liguori, Doctor of the Catholic Church
Vangjel Meksi, Albanian physician, translator and philologist
Attilio Micheluzzi, comics author-artist, graduate in architecture
Giuseppe Mingione, mathematician
Giuseppe Moscati, Roman Catholic saint, physician, educator, and scientist
Francesco Saverio Nitti, economist and politician
Umberto Nobile, aeronautical engineer and Arctic explorer
Luigi Palmieri, physicist
Luca Parmitano, astronaut
Raffaele Piria, chemist
Roberto Saviano, journalist and novelist
Athanas Shundi, Albanian pharmacist and politician
Vincenzo Tiberio, physician
Anna Tramontano, computational biologist
Cinzia Verde, marine biochemistry researcher
Giambattista Vico, philosopher, historian, and jurist
Giuseppe Zaccagnino, diplomat and art collector

Presidents of the Italian Republic

Enrico De Nicola
Giovanni Leone
Giorgio Napolitano

Notable professors

St. Thomas Aquinas, influential philosopher, saint, influential theologian
Leonardo Bianchi, physician and politician
Renato Caccioppoli, mathematician
Antonio Cardarelli, physician and politician
Domenico Cotugno, physician
Nicola Fusco, mathematician
Antonio Genovesi, philosopher and economist
Giovanni Filippo Ingrassia, physician
Stefania Filo Speziale, first woman to graduate in architecture in Naples
Ettore Majorana, physicist
Macedonio Melloni, physicist
Giuseppe Mercalli, volcanologist
Vincenzo Monaldi, physician and physiologist. First Italian Minister of Health
Francesco Saverio Nitti, economist and politician
Luigi Palmieri, physicist and meteorologist
Alessandro Piccolo, Italian chemist and agricultural scientist
Nino Salvatore, physician
Giosuè Sangiovanni, zoologist, founder of the Faculty of Natural Sciences
Filippo Silvestri, entomologist
Giambattista Vico, philosopher, historian, and jurist

Honoris Causa graduates

John Nash
Franco Modigliani
Richard Meier
Umberto Veronesi
Louis Ignarro
Riccardo Muti
Takaaki Kajita
Paolo Sorrentino
Tim Cook

See also
ESDP-Network
List of Italian universities
List of medieval universities
Naples
Botanical Garden of Naples
Orto Botanico di Portici
BioGeM

References

External links

 University of Naples Federico II Website
 Girolamo Arnaldi, Studio di Napoli in Enciclopedia Federiciana, Rome, Istituto dell'Enciclopedia Italiana, 2005.

 
Universities and colleges in Naples
13th-century establishments in the Kingdom of Sicily
Naples Federico II, University of
1224 establishments in Europe
Frederick II, Holy Roman Emperor